
Kolbuszowa County is a unit of territorial administration and local government (powiat) in Subcarpathian Voivodeship, south-eastern Poland. It came into being on January 1, 1999, as a result of the Polish local government reforms passed in 1998.

Neighbouring counties
Kolbuszowa County is bordered by Tarnobrzeg County and Stalowa Wola County to the north, Nisko County to the north-east, Rzeszów County to the south-east, Ropczyce-Sędziszów County to the south, and Mielec County to the west.

Administrative division
The county is subdivided into six gminas (one urban-rural and five rural). These are listed in the following table, in descending order of population.

References

 
Kolbuszowa